Babingtonia is a  genus of flowering plants in the myrtle family, Myrtaceae. The species are native to Australia. Many species formerly placed in the genus are currently included in Sannantha,  Baeckea, Oxymyrrhine, Kardomia, Seorsus and Harmogia.

Species in the genera include:
Babingtonia behrii (Schltdl.) A.R.Bean – broom baeckea	
Babingtonia camphorosmae (Endl.) Lindl. – camphor myrtle  	
Babingtonia cherticola Rye & Trudgen
Babingtonia delicata Rye & Trudgen
Babingtonia erecta Rye & Trudgen
Babingtonia fascifolia Rye
Babingtonia grandiflora (Benth.) Rye – large-flowered babingtonia
Babingtonia maleyae Rye & Trudgen – Narrogin babingtonia
Babingtonia minutifolia Rye & Trudgen
Babingtonia pelloeae Rye & Trudgen – Pelloe's babingtonia
Babingtonia triandra Rye & Hislop – triplet babingtonia	
Babingtonia urbana Rye & Trudgen – coastal plain babingtonia

References

 
Myrtaceae genera
Endemic flora of Australia